The 79th edition of the KNVB Cup (at the time called Amstel Cup) started on June 1, 1996. The final was played on May 8, 1997: Roda JC beat sc Heerenveen 4–2 and won the cup for the first time. A total of 78 clubs participated.

Teams
 All 18 participants of the Eredivisie 1996-97, four of which entering in the knock-out stage, the rest entering in the group stage
 All 18 participants of the Eerste Divisie 1996-97, entering in the group stage (only FC Den Bosch entered in the preliminary round)
 39 teams from lower (amateur) leagues, six of which entering in the group stage, the rest entering in the preliminary round
 3 youth teams, one entering in the group stage, the other two in the preliminary round

Preliminary round
The matches of the preliminary round were played on June 1, 2, 6 and 9, 1996. Except for Eerste Divisie club FC Den Bosch, only amateur clubs and two youth teams participated.

Group stage
The matches of the group stage were played between August 15 and October 1, 1996. Except for four Eredivisie clubs, all other participants entered the tournament this round. 56 clubs participated, 28 advanced to the next round.

E Eredivisie; 1 Eerste Divisie; A Amateur teams

Knock-out Stage

First round
The matches of the first knock-out round were played on November 27, 1996. The four highest ranked Eredivisie teams from last season entered the tournament this round.

E four Eredivisie entrants

Round of 16
The matches of the round of 16 were played between February 7 and 12, 1997.

Quarter finals
The quarter finals were played on March 11 and 12, 1997.

Semi-finals
The semi-finals were played on April 16 and 17, 1997

Final

Roda JC would participate in the Cup Winners' Cup.

See also
Eredivisie 1996-97
Eerste Divisie 1996-97

References

External links
 Results by Ronald Zwiers 

1996-97
1996–97 domestic association football cups
1996–97 in Dutch football